ABC Sports Monday Night Football is a 1996 American football video game by American studio OT Sports named after the television broadcast of the same name. OT Sports released a follow-up title a year later titled ABC Sports Monday Night Football '98 with an updated roster.

Reception

ABC Sports Monday Night Football

Monday Night Football received mixed reviews according to the review aggregation website GameRankings.

ABC Sports Monday Night Football '98

Monday Night Football '98 received more mixed reviews than the original, according to GameRankings.

See also
ABC Monday Night Football (video game) – an NFL video game of the same name released a few years earlier

References
https://archive.kontek.net/gotcha.classicgaming.gamespy.com/gamecenter/Monday%20Night%20Football%20-%20PC%20Review%20-%20Gamecenter%20-%20CNET_com.htm

External links

National Football League video games
1996 video games
North America-exclusive video games
Video games developed in the United States
Windows games
Windows-only games
ABC Sports video games
Monday Night Football